Nelson Jones (born February 13, 1964) is a former professional American football player for the San Diego Chargers in the late 1980s. A native of Woodbury, New Jersey, he played college football at North Carolina State University.

References

1964 births
Living people
American football defensive backs
NC State Wolfpack football players
Players of American football from New Jersey
San Diego Chargers players
Sportspeople from Woodbury, New Jersey
Woodbury Junior-Senior High School alumni